is a mini-album and the third studio album by Yellow Magic Orchestra released in 1980. It contains a mixture of songs and instrumentals by YMO (including a humorous reworking of Archie Bell & the Drells' "Tighten Up"), interspersed with comedy sketches. These sketches are performed by Snakeman Show in both Japanese and English, with YMO participating in some of them.

Reception

Upon release, the US version was well received by the Stereo Review, which described the recording as "terrific" and the performance as "Techno-pop fun." The magazine stated that the "time is right" for the band's "highly technological blend of dance rhythms, heavy metal, and pop melodies" while noting that "Rydeen" in particular "sprints by at a fast clip, ticking off a sprightly tune against a continuous bass-and-drum texture," though the "more rock-style efforts" were not as well received, with the magazine stating that "YMO's electronic tricks" and "the rock sensibility just don't seem to mix." AllMusic later reviewed the Japanese version, describing the record as a "bizarre album" and scoring it 2.5 out of 5 stars.

Release history
×∞Multiplies was released in several formats worldwide. The original Japanese pressing came on 10" vinyl. The United States pressing compiled tracks from both this record and from Solid State Survivor, which had not been released there, while dropping the comedy sketches; the United Kingdom released ×∞Multiplies with additional tracks culled from Yellow Magic Orchestra. All re-issues from 2003 onward reverted to the original Japanese track list (the version with the American track list had been re-issued various times over the years until 1999, when both Japanese and American issues were remastered under Haruomi Hosono's supervision and each received a new set of liner notes—the Japanese by Fantastic Plastic Machine and the American by Derrick May).

The tracks differ slightly between the Japanese and US versions: In the original release Nice Age has an abrupt ending and other tracks crossfade between the Snakeman Show sketches; in the US version these have clean intros and endings and Jingle 'YMO' is listed as part of the Nice Age track.

Track listing

Japanese version

American version
Some pressings included "Tighten Up" as the opening track for side one.

European version
On this pressing, the first "Snakeman Show" is actually "Jingle “Y.M.O.”", while the second "Snakeman Show" is the "Mister Ōhira" skit from the Japanese pressing. "Tighten Up" does not include the "Here We Go Again" section on vinyl, but this is featured on the cassette. 
{{Track listing
| headline = Side one
| title1 = Technopolis
| length1 = 4:14
| music1 = Sakamoto
| title2 = Absolute Ego Dance
| length2 = 4:38
| music2 = Haruomi Hosono
| title3 = Behind the Mask
| length3 = 3:35
| lyrics3 = Mosdell
| music3 = Sakamoto
| title4 = Computer Game 'Theme from The Circus'''
| length4 = 1:45
| music4 = YMO
| title5 = Firecracker
| length5 = 4:52
| music5 = Martin Denny
| title6 = Computer Game 'Theme from The Invader| length6 = 1.00
| music6 = YMO
}}

 Personnel
Yellow Magic Orchestra – arrangements, electronics, directors, mixing engineers
Haruomi Hosono – bass, synth Bass, keyboards, production
Ryuichi Sakamoto – keyboards
Yukihiro Takahashi – vocals, drums, electronic drums, percussion, mannequin costume designSnakeman Show – counterpartsMoichi Kuwahara – voice on "Jingle “Y.M.O.”", script supervisor
Katsuya Kobayashi – voice on "Tighten Up" & "Here We Go Again"
Masato Ibu – voice on "Tighten Up" & "The End of Asia"Guest musiciansHideki Matsutake – microcomposer programming
Chris Mosdell – lyrics, voice on "Citizens of Science"
Kenji Ōmura – electric guitar
Sandii – vocals on "Nice Age"
Mika Fukui – voice on "Nice Age"
The Studio Doo Wap – script supervisorsStaffShōrō Kawazoe – executive producer
Mitsuo Koike – recording and mixing engineer
Norio Yoshizawa, Atsushi Saito, Yasuhiko Terada & Michitaka Tanaka – recording engineers
Takahisa Kamijyo – art director
Kiichi Ichida (Cinq Art) – mannequin modeling
Masayoshi Sukita – photographyUS/Europe versions alternative staff'Sakamoto – vocoded vocals, piano, electric piano, percussion, orchestration
Makoto Ayukawa – electric guitar on "Day Tripper" and "Solid State Survivor"
Sandii – vocals on "Absolute Ego Dance"
Kunihiko Murai and Kawazoe – executive producers
Yoshizawa – recording engineers, remix
Saito & Koike – recording engineers
Al Schmitt – mixing engineer
Mike Reese – mastering engineer
Shunsuke Miyasumi, Masako Hikasa & Akira Ikuta – recording coordinators
Tommy LiPuma – supervisor

Charts×∞Multiplies was the eighth best selling album of 1980 in Japan – the best selling was Solid State Survivor'' as sales continued from the previous year.

References

Yellow Magic Orchestra albums
Alfa Records albums
1980 EPs